Martin Hagen (born October 3, 1954) is an American biathlete. He competed at the 1976 Winter Olympics, the 1980 Winter Olympics and the 1984 Winter Olympics.

References

External links
 

1954 births
Living people
American male biathletes
Olympic biathletes of the United States
Biathletes at the 1976 Winter Olympics
Biathletes at the 1980 Winter Olympics
Biathletes at the 1984 Winter Olympics
People from Jackson Hole, Wyoming